Epsilon (stylized as εpsilon) is Blood Stain Child's fifth studio album and first release on Coroner Records/Pony Canyon. It's also the first and only album to feature vocalist Sophia and drummer Gami (after the departure of vocalist Sadew and drummer/founding-member Violator). All compositions—except "Electricity," which is composed by Aki—are by Ryu, while lyrics are co-written by Sophia. This album was pre-sold during A-Kon from June 10 to 12, 2011. And, in this event, nine of the new songs (including the European bonus track, "Royal Sky") were performed. As of June 7, 2011, Pony Canyon released forty-four second samples of each song in the album; a full sample of "Sirius VI" debuted, through Internet radio, on May 26, 2011.

Track listing

Personnel
Blood Stain Child
Sophia – clean vocals
Ryo – unclean vocals, bass guitar
Ryu – lead guitar
G.S.R. – rhythm guitar
Aki – synthesizers, keyboards, programming, backing vocals
Gami – drums, percussion

Guests
Claudio Ravinale – screams on "Forever Free" and "S.O.P.H.I.A"
Ettore Rigotti – vocals on "Forever Free" and "Moon Light Wave", electronic percussion on "Forever Free".

Production
Produced/Recorded by Blood Stain Child.
Mixed/Mastered by Ettore Rigotti.
Illustrated by Mario Wibisono

Release history

References

2011 albums
Blood Stain Child albums
Pony Canyon albums